Todd Island may refer to:

Todd Island (Ontario), an island in Parry Sound, Ontario, Canada
Todd Island (Manitoba), an island in Manitoba, Canada
Todd Island (Saskatchewan), an island in Saskatchewan, Canada
Todd Island (Nunavut), an island in Nunavut Territory, Canada